= Standard Oil of Colorado =

Standard Oil of Colorado was chartered in Denver, Colorado in 1922. It was eventually rechartered under the name Standard Oil Company of Colorado in 1927 and began to sell stock in 1930.

Standard Oil of Colorado was not related to the well-known Standard Oil company, and did not own any wells, refineries, or gasoline stations.

It was sued in 1931 by Standard Oil of Indiana (which was interested in expanding its marketing influence into the Colorado area) over the use of the "Standard Oil" name. By 1934, the courts ruled in favor of Standard Oil of Indiana, and Standard Oil of Colorado was disbanded.
